Pamuk is a Turkish word meaning cotton, and may refer to:

Surname
 Kemal Pamuk, a fictional character on the television show Downton Abbey
 Melisa Aslı Pamuk (born 1991), Dutch-Turkish beauty pageant titleholder, actress and model 
 Orhan Pamuk (born 1952), Turkish novelist and Nobel Prize winner
 Şevket Pamuk (born 1950), Turkish economist, brother of Orhan Pamuk
 Uğur Pamuk (born 1989), Azerbaijani international footballer

Places
 Pamuk, Hungary, a village in Somogy county, Hungary

Turkish-language surnames